The 1960 Ulster Grand Prix was the sixth round of the 1960 Grand Prix motorcycle racing season. It took place on 6 August 1960 at the Dundrod Circuit.

500 cc classification

350 cc classification

250 cc classification

125 cc classification

References

Ulster Grand Prix
Ulster
Ulster
Ulster Grand Prix